The Central American pine–oak forests is a tropical and subtropical coniferous forests ecoregion in the mountains of northern Central America and Chiapas state in southern Mexico.

Setting

The pine-oak forests lie between  elevation. At lower elevations they transition to tropical moist forests on the Caribbean slope, and to tropical dry forests on the Pacific slope and interior valleys. Elevations above  are often covered with cloud forest ecoregions, including the Sierra Madre de Chiapas moist forests in the Sierra Madre de Chiapas, the Chiapas montane forests along the northern slope of the Chiapas Highlands, and the Central American montane forests in high-elevation enclaves from southern Guatemala to northern Nicaragua.

Flora
The Central American pine–oak forests are composed mostly of pines (Pinus spp.) and oaks (Quercus spp.), with pines more abundant at higher elevations and oaks at lower elevations. Typical pines include Pinus chiapensis, Pinus tecunumanii, Pinus ayacahuite, and Pinus maximinoi. Typical oaks include Quercus corrugata, Quercus skinneri, Quercus oleoides, Quercus calophylla, Quercus acatenangensis, Quercus brachystachys, Quercus peduncularis, Quercus polymorpha, and Quercus acutifolia (syn. Quercus conspersa). American sweetgum (Liquidambar styraciflua) is often found among the oaks and pines.

The Central American pine–oak forests are the southernmost extent of species from genera typical of temperate North America, including pine, fir (Abies guatemalensis), cypress (Cupressus lusitanica), ash (Fraxinus hondurensis and Fraxinus uhdei), and yew (Taxus globosa).

Fauna
Native mammals include jaguar (Panthera onca), puma (Puma concolor), ocelot (Leopardus pardalis), Baird's tapir (Tapirus bairdii), cacomistle (Bassariscus sumichrasti), greater grison (Galictis vittata), tayra (Eira barbara), Central American spider monkey (Ateles geoffroyi), mantled howler monkey (Alouatta palliata), and Mexican mouse opossum (Marmosa mexicana). They also include the bats Balantiopteryx io, Molossus aztecus, Macrotus waterhousii, Glossophaga leachii, Hylonycteris underwoodi, Carollia subrufa, Dermanura azteca, Dermanura tolteca, and Bauerus dubiaquercus. Native rodents include Liomys pictus, Microtus guatemalensis, Ototylomys phyllotis, Peromyscus aztecus, Reithrodontomys sumichrasti, and Scotinomys teguina.

The mountains are designated an Endemic Bird Area, and are home to several limited-range and threatened species. Resident birds include the bearded screech owl (Megascops barbarus), fulvous owl (Strix fulvescens), ocellated quail (Cyrtonyx ocellatus), belted flycatcher (Xenotriccus callizonus), pink-headed warbler (Cardellina versicolor), black-capped siskin (Spinus atriceps), green-throated mountaingem (Lampornis sybillae), wine-throated hummingbird (Selasphorus ellioti), blue-throated motmot (Aspatha gularis), black-capped swallow (Atticora pileata), rufous-browed wren (Troglodytes rufociliatus), blue-and-white mockingbird (Melanotis hypoleucus), rufous-collared thrush (Turdus rufitorques), bar-winged oriole (Icterus maculialatus), and bushy-crested jay (Cyanocorax melanocyaneus).

The pine–oak forests provide a winter home for several migratory species from temperate North America, including the golden-cheeked warbler (Dendroica chrysoparia) and azure-rumped tanager (Tangara cabanisi).

Protected areas
11.67% of the ecoregion is in protected areas. Protected areas include:

El Salvador
 El Boquerón National Park (Crater del Volcán de San Salvador National Park)
 Los Volcanes National Park
 Montecristo National Park
 San Isidro Natural Monument

Guatemala
 Cerro del Baúl National Park
 El Pital Biological Reserve
 Ixil Visis-Cabá Biosphere Reserve
 Iximché Cultural Monument
 Laguna Lachuá National Park
 Laguna del Pino National Park
 Cuenca del Lago Atitlán Multiple Use Area
 Volcán y Laguna de Ipala Multiple Use Area
 Los Aposentos National Park
 Mario Dary Rivera Protected Biotope
 Naciones Unidas National Park
 Riscos de Momostenango National Park
 Trifinio Biosphere Reserve
 Volcán de Pacaya and Laguna de Calderas National Park
 Volcán Tacaná Biosphere Reserve

Honduras
 Agalta National Park
 Boquerón Natural Monument
 Celaque National Park
 Cerro Azul Meámbar National Park
 Cerro de Uyuca Biological Reserve
 Copán Ruins Cultural Monument
 Congolón, Piedra Parada and Coyocutena National Park
 Corralitos Wildlife Refuge
 El Chile Biological Reserve
 Erapuca Wildlife Refuge
 Guajiquiro Biological Reserve
 Güisayote Biological Reserve
 La Muralla Wildlife Refuge
 La Tigra National Park
 Misoco Biological Reserve
 Mixcure Wildlife Refuge
 Montaña de Botaderos Carlos Escaleras Mejía National Park
 Montaña de Comayagua National Park
 Montaña Verde Wildlife Refuge
 Montecillos Biological Reserve
 Montecristo Trifinio National Park
 Opalaca Biological Reserve
 Patuca National Park
 Pech Montaña El Carbón Anthropological and Forest Reserve
 Puca Wildlife Refuge
 Río Plátano Biosphere Reserve
 Sabanetas Biological Reserve
 Tawahka Asagni Biosphere Reserve
 Volcán Pacayita Biological Reserve
 Yerba Buena Biological Reserve
 Yuscarán (Monserrat) Biological Reserve

Mexico
 El Triunfo Biosphere Reserve
 Gertrude Duby Biotic Reserve
 Humedales de Montaña La Kisst
 Humedales de Montaña María Eugenia
 La Sepultura Biosphere Reserve
 Lagunas de Montebello National Park
 Sumidero Canyon National Park
 Zona de Protección Forestal en los terrenos que se encuentran en los municipios de La Concordia, Angel Albino Corzo, Villa Flores y Jiquipilas

Nicaragua
 Cerro Apante Nature Reserve
 Cerro Cumaica–Cerro Alegre Nature Reserve
 Cerro Datanlí–El Diablo Nature Reserve
 Cerro El Arenal Nature Reserve
 Cerro Guabule Nature Reserve
 Cerro Quiabuc–Las Brisas Nature Reserve
 Cerro Tisey–Estanzuela Nature Reserve
 Cerro Tomabú Nature Reserve
 Cerros de Yalí Nature Reserve
 Fila Cerro Frío–La Cumplida Nature Reserve
 Serranías de Dipilto–Jalapa Nature Reserve
 Sierra Amerrisque Nature Reserve
 Somoto Canyon National Monument
 Tepesomoto–Pataste Nature Reserve
 Yucul Genetic Resources Reserve

Internationally designated protected areas include Río Plátano Biosphere Reserve, a World Heritage Site, and the Ramsar Sites Humedales de Montaña La Kisst, Lago de Apanás - Asturias, Lagunas de Montebello National Park, Sumidero Canyon National Park, Embalse Cerrón Grande, Eco-región Lachuá, Complejo Güija, Humedales de Montaña María Eugenia, and Sistema de Humedales de la Zona Sur de Honduras.

See also
 List of ecoregions in Mexico
 List of ecoregions in Guatemala
 List of ecoregions in El Salvador

References

 
Ecoregions of Central America
Ecoregions of El Salvador
Ecoregions of Guatemala
Ecoregions of Honduras
Ecoregions of Mexico
Ecoregions of Nicaragua

Forests of El Salvador
Forests of Mexico
Forests of Nicaragua
Montane forests
Sierra Madre de Chiapas
Neotropical ecoregions
Tropical and subtropical coniferous forests